The South Australian Railway Company was an attempt in the 1840s by private capitalists to establish a railway in the infant colony of South Australia.  The company was based in London, where most of the capital was to be raised, £25,000 in the first instance.  There were two or three local directors, since in the days before electric undersea cable telegraph, London was too far away for effective control.

Routes 
The first route from Adelaide to Port Adelaide was only 6 miles long, quite straight and flat and suitable for horse drawn operation.  The initial line was to be single track, with frequent crossing loops.

A longer route to the Burra copper mines was proposed later on.

Directors 
British directors (possibly incomplete): G. F. Angas, Esq., George Barnes Esq, W.G Gover, Esq., Rowland Hill, Esq., J. B. Montefiore, Esq.: Managing Director.—Edwin Hill, Esq.: Colonial Director—Robert Gouger, Esq.

The provisional committee in February 1846 was:

Collapse 
In the event the railway was too ambitious, and ahead of its time.  It was stillborn.

Timeline 
 1836 Colony of South Australia is founded
 1846 (February) Advertisement for Prospectus to raise capital of £25,000. (with power to increase).
 1846 (July) Special Meeting to approve amalgamation with the Adelaide City and Port Railway Company
 1850 Survey of his proposed line to a point distant 65 to 70 miles from Adelaide, and only 26 miles from the Burra Burra Copper mines.
 1854 Steam operated government railway opens.
 1856 Sir—May I be permitted to enquire what has become of the funds collected by the South Australian Railway Company. I hold scrip, of which the ...
 1865 A South Australian Railway Company has been projected, and several influential parties are moving in the matter.

See also 
 Rail transport in South Australia
 List of former Australian railway companies

References 

Rail transport in South Australia
History of transport in South Australia